Francisco Manuel Carlos Guzmán (born September 17, 1940), best known as Cisco Carlos, is an American former professional baseball pitcher. He played from 1967 through 1970 for the Chicago White Sox and Washington Senators of Major League Baseball (MLB). LIsted at 6' 3", 205 lb., Carlos batted and threw right handed. He was born in Monrovia, California, of Mexican American descent.

Amateur career
Carlos was a pitcher for the University of Northern Colorado team that participated in the 1960 College World Series. He was signed by the White Sox as an amateur free agent in 1961 and spent the next six seasons in their farm system.

Professional career
That year, the White Sox were involved in a four-way American League pennant race with the Boston Red Sox, Detroit Tigers and Minnesota Twins. The White Sox were eliminated from the race in the final days of the season, but not before Carlos won two games to keep them in contention. On September 10 he defeated the Tigers 4–0 in the second game of a doubleheader at Comiskey Park, allowing four hits in six innings; the game came hours after Joe Horlen's no-hitter over the Tigers in the first game. Four days later, Carlos shut out the Cleveland Indians 4–0 in ten innings, the ChiSox winning the game on Don Buford's grand slam in the bottom of the tenth.

However, in this, the "Year of the Pitcher", he posted a 4–14 record with a 3.90 earned run average—almost a full run above the league average of 2.98.

He posted a 13–9 record with the Senators' Triple A club, the Denver Bears of the American Association.

In his MLB career, Carlos posted an 11–18 record with 119 strikeouts and a 3.72 ERA in 237 innings.

Personal
Following his baseball retirement, Carlos founded Cabinets by Design, a family owned kitchen, bath and storage design and renovation firm located at Phoenix and Scottsdale in Arizona, which has provided its services for more than 25 years.

References

External links
, or Retrosheet, or Pura Pelota (Venezuelan Winter League)

1940 births
Living people
American baseball players of Mexican descent
American expatriate baseball players in Mexico
American interior designers
Baseball players from California
Chicago White Sox players
Citrus Owls baseball players
Clinton C-Sox players
Colorado State Rams baseball players
Columbus Astros players
Denver Bears players
Eugene Emeralds players
Evansville White Sox players
Harlan Smokies players
Idaho Falls Russets players
Indianapolis Indians players
Lynchburg White Sox players
Major League Baseball pitchers
Mexican League baseball pitchers
Navegantes del Magallanes players
American expatriate baseball players in Venezuela
Northern Colorado Bears baseball players
People from Monrovia, California
Sultanes de Monterrey players
Tucson Toros players
Visalia White Sox players
Washington Senators (1961–1971) players